The Cheetahs (known for sponsorship reasons as the Toyota Cheetahs), is a South African professional rugby union team that played Super Rugby between 2006 and 2017, before joining the Pro14 (now United Rugby Championship) competition prior to the 2017–18 season. They are based at the Free State Stadium in Bloemfontein. They have been included with the Lions (Of the URC) to compete in the 2022-23 EPCR Challenge Cup.

The Cheetahs was one of the two new franchises that entered the expanded Super 14 competition in 2006, the other being Australia's Western Force. The Central Union was awarded the fifth South African franchise over the SEC franchise in April 2005. In its first season the Cheetahs did surprisingly well, finishing tenth in the final standings, out of 14 sides. Prior to being accepted into the 2006 Super 14 season, the Cheetahs were represented as a part of the Cats. In addition, before the South African Rugby Union entered regionalised franchises into the competition, the Free State Cheetahs side competed in the 1997 Super 12 season.

Strip

The primary strip for the Toyota Cheetahs is an orange jersey with a white collar and white trim. Black shorts with orange socks and white trim. The colours are representative of the Free State Currie Cup side; orange and white (Free State Cheetahs)

The alternative jersey is the same design, though it is a white jersey with an orange collar and orange trim. Black shorts with orange socks and white trim.

History

Prior to South Africa entering franchises into the then Super 12, the domestic Currie Cup sides competed instead. The Free State Cheetahs, one of the sides that make up the current Central Cheetahs, competed in one Super 12 season in 1997. The Free State played 11 matches, winning 5 and losing 6. They placed 7th on the end of season standings.

Proposals by the Central Union franchise and the SEC (Southern and Eastern Cape) franchise were studied for the allocation of a fifth Super Rugby team licence. The Central Union emphasized points to the SARU such as that the region is second only to the Western Province in terms of producing players for the national side. The Central Union noted that they have a strong and stable fanbase that would be able to meet financial and administrative responsibilities and demands of a Super 14 rugby side.

In mid April 2005, the South African Rugby Union announced that the Central Unions franchise would be its fifth team for the expanded Super 14 competition that would begin in 2006. They were awarded the franchise ahead of the Southern and Eastern Cape (see Southern Spears). In the pre-season of their entrance to the new look Super 14 competition, the Cheetahs played both of the other new franchises, new Australian team; the Western Force and 2007 fellow South African team, the Southern Spears. The Cheetahs proved to be the strongest out of the new sides, demolishing the Spears 48 to nil and soundly defeating the Force in Perth. 
The Cheetahs played their first game on 10 February, proving they are fighting fit, but were not good enough on the day for the South African Bulls, losing their first official match in Bloemfontein 18 points to 30. The Cheetahs won their first Super 14 game in week two, defeating the Sharks in a thrilling match seeing the Cheetahs win by a single point, 27 to 26. Entering round four of the 2006 season, the Cheetahs were facing the table leaders, the Hurricanes. In a surprise result, the Cheetahs beat the table leaders, thus winning their first home game and proving they deserve to be in the Super 14.

The Cheetahs finally broke their drought in overseas matches with an upset over the New South Wales Waratahs on 19 March 2011.

Following SANZAAR's decision to reduce the number of teams for 2018, the South African Rugby Union announced that the Cheetahs would be one of the teams cut from the 2018 competition. Instead, the Cheetahs joined the previously-northern hemispherean Pro14 competition prior to the 2017–18 season.

The Cheetahs were unable to compete in the 2020–21 Pro14 due to COVID-19 pandemic travel restrictions. Instead, the team played the Super Rugby Unlocked in late 2020 and the Preparation Series in early 2021. However, the Cheetahs were not invited into the Pro14 Rainbow Cup. The Pro14 was rebranded as the United Rugby Championship for the 2021–22, and the team was not selected to enter it.

Honours

Minor Honours
 Lafarge Zimbabwe Champions Cup winners 2016
 Toyota Challenge: winners 4 times 2021, 2022 runner up 1 time 2021

Stadia

The Cheetahs' home stadium is the Free State Stadium, previously referred to as Vodacom Park for sponsorship purposes, located in Bloemfontein. The stadium had its capacity increased to 48,000 for the 2010 FIFA World Cup. The stadium is the home of Free State rugby as it is also home to the Free State Cheetahs, a Currie Cup side which produces a large number of players for the Cheetahs franchise. A then-capacity crowd of 37,383 watched the Cheetahs in their first official Super 14 match against the Bulls on 10 February 2006.

The Cheetahs also previously played matches at Griquas Park in Kimberley, the home of the Griqualand West Rugby Union, and at North West Stadium in Welkom, the home of the Griffons Rugby Union.

Season by season record

 Bold indicates current team player

Current squad

The Cheetahs squad for 2022–23 EPCR Challenge Cup is:

Coaches
  Rassie Erasmus (2006–2007)
  Naka Drotské (2008–2015)
  Franco Smith (2016–2017)
  Rory Duncan (2017–2018)
  Franco Smith (2018–2019)
  Hawies Fourie (2019–present)

Captains
  Juan Smith (2006–2011)
  Adriaan Strauss (2012–2014)
  Francois Uys (2015)
  Francois Venter (2016–2018)
  Oupa Mohojé (2018)
  Tian Meyer (2018–present)

Records

Pro14 records

The Cheetahs' Pro14 records are as follows (updated 11 February 2018):

Super Rugby records

The Cheetahs' Super Rugby records are as follows:

See also

Rugby union in South Africa

References

External links
 

 
Super Rugby teams
South African rugby union teams
Bloemfontein
Sport in the Northern Cape
Sport in the Free State (province)
2005 establishments in South Africa
United Rugby Championship teams